A yo-yo club is a sporting side that is regularly promoted and relegated. The phrase is most typically used in association football in the United Kingdom, especially in reference to promotion to and relegation from the Premier League.

The name is derived from the toy yo-yo which goes up and down a string. In Germany the equivalent term is Fahrstuhlmannschaft; in Greece it is ομάδα ασανσέρ; in Hispanic countries it is equipo ascensor; in Danish elevatorhold; in Russia they often say команда-лифт; and in Chinese it is called 升降机; All six terms literally mean "lift team" or "elevator team".  In the Netherlands, the term is heen-en-weer club - "to-and-fro club". In Polish, yo-yo clubs are referred to as wańka-wstańka, which translates to "roly-poly toy". In Romanian, clubs oscillating between the first and second tier are called ABBA, in reference to these leagues' former names, Divizia A and Divizia B.

In England the phrase has been used to describe, among others, Birmingham City,  Fulham, Hull City, Norwich City, Queens Park Rangers, Rotherham United, Watford and West Bromwich Albion.

West Brom were an archetypal yo-yo club throughout the first decade of the 21st-century, during which time they were promoted four times and relegated three times. Similarly, Crystal Palace reached the Premier League five times and were relegated the following season on the first four occasions, but have now survived in the top flight since 2013. In recent years, Norwich City and Fulham have become "tandem" yo-yo clubs; in every season between 2018 and 2022, one of each club has been promoted to the Premier League while the other has been relegated.

England

Birmingham City 
Birmingham City have been promoted to and relegated from the top division more times than any other English club, with 12 promotions and 12 relegations.

Birmingham's longest period in one division has been 18 years in the First Division, from 1921 to 1939. Their next longest was 10 years, also in the First Division, between 1955 and 1965.

Elected to Division Two in 1892, Birmingham were promoted to Division One in 1894 and relegated in 1896. Their next promotion came in 1901, and was followed immediately by relegation in 1902 and a third promotion in 1903. This time they lasted five years in the First Division, before relegation in 1908.

The next 70 years (including the breaks for the two world wars) were comparatively stable, with only three relegations and four promotions. After their seventh relegation, in 1979, they were promoted at the first attempt; the same happened in 1984 and 1985, but after their ninth relegation, in 1986, they spent 16 years out of the top flight.

During these 16 seasons Birmingham had two separate spells in the Third Division: from 1989 to 1992 (three seasons), and from 1994 to 1995 (one season).

They were promoted to the Premier League for the first time in 2002.  Their first spell in this league lasted four years, but in the four years from 2006 to 2009 they were relegated twice and promoted twice.

In 2011 they were relegated again, and this was the eighth time since 1979 that this had happened to Birmingham. Six of these relegations were between the top two divisions, and two were between the second and third. They have remained in the second-tier Championship since.

Brighton & Hove Albion

Brighton & Hove Albion have had only, until 2017, one brief spell in the top flight of English football, from 1979 to 1983, but in the 53 years since 1958 they have been relegated nine times and promoted 10 times.

Founder members of the Football League Third Division in 1920, they remained at that level (Third Division South from 1921) for 31 seasons (38 years, including the break for World War II). Since 1958, the longest period they have spent in any one division has been seven years in the Third, from 1965 to 1972.

After winning promotion to the Second Division for the first time in 1958, they suffered consecutive relegations in 1962 and 1963 to reach the Fourth Division for the first time. (The Fourth Division was created in 1958.)  Sixteen years later in 1979 they reached the other extreme when they won promotion to the First Division for the first time, but 17 years after that in 1996 they were back in the fourth tier of English football (now known as Football League Two).

In the six years from 2001 to 2006, Brighton experienced three promotions and two relegations, leaving them in the third tier (now known as Football League One), and in 2011 they were promoted to the Championship for the first time.

In 2017, Brighton finally achieved promotion back into the top flight for the first time in 34 years, finishing second and gaining automatic promotion.

Grimsby Town
Grimsby Town are the most frequent yo-yo club, switching divisions a total of 32 times in their history with 15 promotions and 17 relegations as well as transferring from the Third Division South to the Third Division North in 1921.

Their longest consecutive spell in the same division was 8, immediately after they were founder members of division 2, between 1892 and 1901.

Promotion years: 1901, 1911, 1926, 1929, 1934, 1956, 1962, 1972, 1979, 1980, 1990, 1991, 1998, 2016, 2022

Relegation years: 1903, 1910, 1920, 1932, 1948, 1951, 1959, 1964, 1968, 1977, 1987, 1988, 1997, 2003, 2004, 2010, 2021

Hull City
Hull City have been promoted to the Premier League in 2008, 2013 and 2016, with relegations to the Championship in 2010, 2015 and 2017.

Leicester City

Leicester City had three separate spells in the Premier League between 1994 and 2004. The second lasted six years (1996 to 2002), but the other two only one year each (1994–95 and 2003–04). After each of the first two relegations they returned to the Premier League after only one season, but after being relegated in 2004, they were out of the top flight for ten seasons, until their promotion in 2014. In 2008, they were relegated to League One (the old Third Division) for the first time, but they were promoted back to the Championship at the first attempt. The team eventually was promoted back to the Premier League in 2013–14, making a total of five promotions and three relegations in 20 years. They have remained in the Premier League ever since their last promotion, including winning the title in 2015–16, the first league trophy overall for Leicester.

Manchester City
Of the 107 seasons that Manchester City have spent in the English Football League, 25 have been outside the top flight.  But in the 18 years from 1983 to 2001, they were relegated from the top flight four times; and they even spent one season in the third tier.

Founder members of the Football League Second Division in 1892, City gained promotion to the First Division for the first time in 1899.  They spent 63 of the following 73 seasons in the First Division (the top tier), despite suffering relegation six times – of their six spells in the Second Division over this period, the longest was three years, from 1963 to 1966.  But they were relegated twice in the 1980s, and two years after another relegation in 1996 they dropped into the Third Division (then known as the Second Division) for the first time in their history – their only season at that level, to date, being 1998–99.

City have now been back in the Premier League since 2002 and, since being bought by Sheikh Mansour of the Abu Dhabi royal family, have won six Premier League titles (2012, 2014, 2018, 2019, 2021, and 2022) in recent history.

Middlesbrough
Middlesbrough changed divisions 10 times in the 16 years from 1982 to 1998.

Following relegation in 1954 they had been out of the First Division for 20 years, and had dropped into the Third Division for the first time in their history (1966–67).

After regaining their First Division place in 1974 they were relegated again in 1982, and in 1986 they dropped into the Third Division again.  This time they almost went out of business, but they quickly recovered and two successive promotions took them back into the First Division by 1988. They lasted only one season, and spent three more years in the Second Division before winning promotion to the newly created Premier League in 1992.

They stayed there for only one season, but regained their Premier League place two years later as First Division champions. Two years later, despite investing over £10 million in transfer fees for famous international players, a three-point penalty for failing to fulfil a fixture cost Boro their Premier League status. This time they regained it at the first attempt, and they held on to it for 11 years, but played seven consecutive seasons in the Championship following relegation in 2009. Middlesbrough gained promotion as Championship runners-up in the 2015–16 campaign only to suffer another relegation in the following season.

Millwall
Millwall have yo-yoed between the second and third tier of English Football throughout their 92 consecutive seasons in the Football League. They have spent two seasons in the top tier, 42 in the second, 43 in the third and five in the fourth tier. They have been promoted 11 times (five as champions) and relegated 10 times. They've been promoted a record eight times from the third tier, and relegated six times from the second tier.

Northampton Town
When the regional divisions were scrapped in 1957, the club was placed in Division Four. The 1960s proved to be a remarkable decade for the club.

Promoted in 1961, Northampton were Division Three champions in 1963 and in 1965 they won promotion to the First Division. 
Having risen from the Fourth to the First Divisions, their decline was equally spectacular.

Relegated after one season at the top, by 1972 they were applying for re-election to the Fourth Division.

Norwich City
In 1971–72, Norwich City won the second tier and reached the top flight for the first time.  In the next 23 seasons the club was relegated to the second tier three times (1973–74, 1980–81, 1984–85) but they always bounced back to the top flight at the first attempt (1974–75, 1981–82, 1985–86).  Since being relegated in 1994–95, the club has been promoted a total of six times (2003–04, 2009–10, 2010–11, 2014–15, 2018–19, 2020–21) and relegated seven times (1994–95, 2004–05, 2008–09, 2013–14, 2015–16, 2019–20, 2021–22), with one of those seasons (2009–10) spent in the third tier.

Managers of the team that have celebrated promotion in the Premier League era are Nigel Worthington (2003–04), Paul Lambert (2009–10, 2010–11), Alex Neil (2014–15) and Daniel Farke (2018–19 and 2020–21), whereas managers in the same era suffering relegation have been Gary Megson (1994–95), Nigel Worthington (2004–05), Bryan Gunn (2008–09), Neil Adams (2013–14), Alex Neil (2015–16), Daniel Farke (2019–20) and Dean Smith (2021–22).

In 2018, Gregor Robertson, writing in The Times, described Norwich City as "The perennial yo-yo club".

Notts County 

Notts County are the second most frequent yo-yo club, switching divisions a total of 29 times in their history with 13 promotions and 16 relegations.

Promotion years: 1897, 1914, 1923, 1931, 1950, 1960, 1971, 1973, 1981, 1990, 1991, 1998, 2010

Relegation years: 1893, 1913, 1920, 1926, 1930, 1935, 1958, 1959, 1964, 1984, 1985, 1992, 1995, 1997, 2004, 2015, 2019.

Notts County have spent a total of 30 seasons in the top flight of English football, all of which were in Division 1. They have never played in the Premiership, as they suffered relegation from the old First Division the season before it became the Premiership. They have spent a further 37 seasons in the second tier, 31 in the third tier, and 15 in the fourth tier. After the 2018–19 season, they dropped into the National League for the first time in their history.

Sheffield Wednesday
Prior to World War II, Sheffield Wednesday were one of England's most successful clubs; they won their fourth Football League title in 1930, and they won the FA Cup for the third time in 1935.  But they were relegated to the Second Division in 1937, and after promotion in 1950 they experienced three more relegations in the next eight years: in 1951, 1955, and 1958.  Each time they won promotion at the first attempt, and it was their manager Eric Taylor who referred to this period as "the yo-yo years".

After their fourth promotion in nine years, in 1959, Wednesday remained in the First Division until 1970 (and came close to winning their fourth F.A. Cup in 1966, when they lost a memorable final to Everton).  But in 1975 they dropped into the Third Division for the first time, and in 2010 they began their third spell at this level. However, in May 2012, they were promoted back to the Championship. Since 1970 they have had two periods in the top flight – totalling 14 seasons – but they have never yet repeated the frequent ups and downs of the 1950s.

Sunderland
After joining the Football League in 1890, Sunderland were one of the most successful clubs in the Country, winning the First Division on six occasions, the last in 1936; they also won the FA Cup on one occasion, in 1937 FA Cup Final.

In 1958, Sunderland were relegated for the first time in their history, they then spent seven seasons in the second tier, gaining promotion in 1964, they were relegated in 1970 and spent a further six seasons in the Second Division; it was during this spell that Sunderland won their second FA Cup, beating Leeds United in the 1973 FA Cup Final FA Cup Final.

Between 1976 and 1990 Sunderland yo-yoed between the top two divisions, with a one-season spell in the Third Division in 1987-88, when they were promoted back to the Second Division at the first time of asking.

In 1990, Sunderland reached the play-off final at Wembley Stadium. Despite losing the match against Swindon Town 1-0 Sunderland were promoted after Swindon were punished by the Football League for financial irregularities. The stay was short and they were relegated in 1991.

Under the management of Peter Reid, Sunderland were promoted to the Premiership in 1996; again it was a short stay, returning to the second tier in 1997.

Between 1997 and 2017, Sunderland never finished lower than third in the second tier of English Football, managing to achieve successive top 7 finishes in the Premiership 2000 and 2001 and a top 10 finish in 2011.

Sunderland spent 10 seasons in The Premier League between 2007 and 2017, when they were relegated to the Championship; one year later Sunderland were relegated to the third tier for the first time since 1987.

In total Sunderland have been promoted ten times and relegated 11 times.

Promotion Years
1964, 1976, 1980, 1988, 1990, 1996, 1999, 2005, 2007, 2022

Relegation Years
1958, 1970, 1977, 1985, 1987, 1991, 1997, 2003, 2006, 2017, 2018

Watford
Following promotion from the Southern League at the end of the 1919–20 season, Watford spent their existence in the Football League's basement Third Division South, restructured to the Fourth Division for the 1958–59 Season, before achieving their first promotion within the Football League structure, to the Third Division, at the end of 1959–60. Watford spent nine seasons at this level before a further promotion to the Second Division at the end of 1968–69. However, their stay at this level was short-lived and they were twice relegated, at the end of the 1971–72 and 1974–75 seasons, to sink back to the Fourth Division.

Under the auspices of chairman Elton John and manager Graham Taylor, Watford achieved promotions in consecutive seasons between 1977 and 1979 to reach the Second Division once again. This was followed by three seasons at that level, culminating in achieving runners-up position in 1981–82 and promotion to the First Division.

Watford were league runners-up in their first season as a First Division club, and were FA Cup losing finalists a year later. But they were back in the Second Division come 1988–89, and slipped into the third tier of the league (by then the new Football League Division Two) at the end of the 1995–96 season. They were promoted back to Division One two years later after winning the Division Two title, and a Division One playoff triumph the following year earned them promotion to the Premiership.

Watford were unable to adjust to the pace of Premiership football and were relegated at the end of their first top-flight season in more than a decade. They won the Championship playoff in 2005–06, but last place in the Premiership the following season ensured their 11th movement in 25 seasons. After finishing runners-up in the Championship in 2014–15, Watford were promoted once again and competed in the Premier League in 2015–16. The club finished 13th, thereby maintaining Premier League status for the first time, and subsequently finished 17th, 14th and 11th in its next three Premier League seasons, while also reaching an FA Cup final. They were relegated again in the 2019–20 season, despite notching a 3–0 win over Liverpool, who had been unbeaten in league play that season and ultimately went on to win their first-ever Premier League title. They bounced back at the first attempt, only to be relegated again at the end of the following season.

West Bromwich Albion
Since 2002, West Bromwich Albion have provided a classic example of the yo-yo. Between 2002 and 2010 they were promoted to the Premier League four times and relegated back to Division One (known since 2004 as The Championship) three times, and 2011 was the first year since 1999 that they were not involved in either a promotion or a relegation battle, in most cases right up to the last match of the season.

Albion were promoted in 2002, relegated in 2003, promoted in 2004, achieved what has become known as "The Great Escape" in 2005 when they became the first ever club to avoid relegation from the Premier League after being in bottom place at Christmas, relegated in 2006, lost the 2007 play-off Final to Derby County, promoted in 2008, relegated in 2009 and promoted in 2010. They remained in the Premier League until the end of the 2017–18 season when the club was relegated to the Championship once again. Having lost to Aston Villa in the 2019 playoffs, they won automatic promotion in 2020. In 2021, they were relegated to the Championship again.

In 2000, Albion had been in real danger of relegation to Division Two right up to the last day of the season, and in 2001 they reached the Division One play-offs, losing in the semi-finals to Bolton Wanderers. Albion had also spent two years in the Third Division between 1991 and 1993, after being relegated from the top tier in 1986.

Wolverhampton Wanderers
Wolves were one of the most famous yo-yo clubs during the 1980s. They began the decade on a high by winning the League Cup in 1980, only to suffer relegation to the Second Division and narrowly avoid bankruptcy two years later. They regained their First Division status at the first attempt, only to endure successive relegations over the next few seasons and slip into the Fourth Division for the first time in 1986. Fourth Division championship glory came two years later and the following year Wolves were Third Division champions and promoted to the Second Division. During the 1980s, Wolves had moved divisions seven times in eight seasons. They have spent all but one of their 17 subsequent seasons in the league's second tier (Second Division, Division One and now the Championship), having been in the Premier League during the 2003–04 season. Wolves won the Football League Championship title in 2009, but were relegated in 2012 after three seasons in the Premier League and relegated again a year later. Wolves finally returned to the Championship at the first attempt as League One champions in 2013–14, and were promoted to the Premier League following the 2017–18 season. They went on to finish seventh on their return, which was their best performance since 1979–80, and claimed victories over four of the Big Six. Their league position was enough to qualify for the 2019–20 UEFA Europa League.

Overall total

The table below shows the total number of relegations and promotions (of select clubs) between the top four tiers of English football as of the beginning of the 2020–21 season.

Germany

In German, yo-yo clubs are referred to as Fahrstuhlmannschaften (lit. lift teams or elevator teams). 1. FC Nürnberg has been promoted or relegated 16 times between the first-tier Bundesliga and the second-tier 2. Bundesliga. Arminia Bielefeld (14 moves), VfL Bochum, Hertha BSC (both 12), Karlsruher SC and MSV Duisburg (both 11) each are also considered to be yo-yo clubs in German club football, as well as Hansa Rostock (16 moves) and Union Berlin (12) if the league system in the former East Germany is included in the statistics. More recently, SC Paderborn 07 has become a yo-yo club. In 2014, the club was promoted to the first division. In 2017, it barely avoided relegation to the fourth division. In 2019, Paderborn reached the first division once again where they were immediately relegated to the second division once again.

Ghana
Bofoakwa Tano have been promoted or relegated nine times since finishing bottom in 1979. They were promoted back to the top flight in 1982, but were relegated again in 1985. The club reappeared in the top division in 1989–90, by which time the league had switched to winter. They were relegated again in 1990–91, promoted back in 1994–95, relegated in 1996–97, promoted in 1997–98. In 1999 they finished third from bottom, but avoided another relegation by winning a play-off. However, they were relegated again in 2006–07.

Hong Kong
Hong Kong Football Club has won many titles in the second-tier competition in Hong Kong Soccer League history, however, they have rarely enjoyed success when playing against the professional sides in top-tier competitions. Therefore, they have the local nickname the lift (Chinese: 升降機), which is the equivalent of the term yo-yo club.

Ireland
Irish club Finn Harps are known as a yo-yo club due to the regular frequency of the club's relegation and promotion to and from the League of Ireland Premier Division and the League of Ireland First Division. Drogheda United are another example of the yo-yo club as they swapped divisions every season between 1993–94 and 2000–01.

Italy
Historically, yo-yo clubs between Italy's top two divisions, Serie A and Serie B, have included Cagliari, Chievo, Hellas Verona, Bari, Brescia, Empoli and Lecce. In more recent years, Frosinone, Crotone and Benevento have seen multiple promotions and relegations in successive seasons.

Netherlands

Dutch football club FC Volendam are known as the Heen-en-weer club (The to-and-fro club): they won promotion from the Eerste Divisie to the Eredivisie in 1959, were relegated in 1960, were promoted in 1961, were relegated in 1964, were promoted in 1967, were relegated in 1969, were promoted in 1970, were relegated in 1972, were promoted in 1977, were relegated in 1979, were promoted in 1983, were relegated in 1985, were promoted in 1987, were relegated in 1998, were promoted in 2003 and were relegated in 2004. In 2008 FC Volendam promoted once again, only to finish last and be therefore relegated the following year. For the 2009–10 season, the club is playing in the Eerste Divisie.

In the 21st Century VVV Venlo have also frequently oscillated between the top two divisions.

Norway

Starting in 1979 and ending in 1987, SK Brann were promoted in every odd-numbered year and relegated in every even-numbered year. This is the world record for consecutive relegations-promotions.

Poland
The Polish club Wisła Płock is often referred to as a yo-yo club (wańka-wstańka in Polish). They were promoted to the Polish First League in 1994 (known as Petrochemia Płock at the time), but were relegated after one season. Promoted again in 1997, they again were relegated after one season. Their next promotion came (after changing their name to Petro Płock) in 2000, and this time they managed to avoid relegation after one season. However, the next season (known now as Orlen Płock) they were again relegated. In 2002, reverting to the original name Wisła Płock, they were promoted to First League, and finally enjoyed relative stability, even reaching the Polish Cup final in 2003 and winning it in 2006. However, relegation was again in order in 2007. After that, they spent three years in the second tier before being relegated to the third in 2010. They immediately got promoted to the second tier, but got relegated from it again in 2012. They were once again promoted to the second tier the following season, spending three years in it, before finally returning to the Ekstraklasa in 2016. In spite of this "yo-yoing," Wisła have avoided the fate of other relegated clubs in Poland, such as bankruptcy (e.g. Szczakowianka Jaworzno) or further relegation to lower divisions (e.g. Raków Częstochowa).

Scotland
In terms of relegation from the top flight Dundee are Scotland’s foremost yo-yo club having been relegated from the first tier a record nine times, eight of which have come since league reconstruction in 1975. Following them are Partick Thistle with seven relegations from the top flight, followed by St Mirren and St Johnstone with six relegations/promotions apiece, and Heart of Midlothian, Kilmarnock and Dundee United who sit with five each.

However Stirling Albion F.C. are Scotland’s number one yo-yo club overall, winning promotion from the Second Division six times from 1949 to 1965 alone and having been relegated a record 14 times in their history since the club’s formation in 1945.

Sweden
In Sweden the term has been used especially for Hammarby IF's men's soccer team but also Katrineholms SK's men's bandy team during the early-mid 1990s.

Turkey

In Turkey, these kinds of clubs are called asansör takım (elevator team). Karşıyaka S.K. relegated from first level in 1964, 1967, 1972, 1991, 1994 and 1996. Karşıyaka also played in third level between 1973–1980 and 2001–2003. Also Sakaryaspor has an interesting statistic. They promoted in 1981, relegated in 1986. But they promoted again after the 1986–87 season. However they could only stay in first level for three seasons and relegated again in 1990. They came back to first level for a single season in 1998–99. They were back again in first level in 2004–05, but relegated same season. They won the 2005–06 play-offs and promoted to first level again, just to relegate after one season. They almost repeated same thing when they reached play-offs in 2007–08 but this time they lost and finally "stayed" in second level for a second season in row. Sakaryaspor later relegated to once to third level in 2008–09 season. Sakaryaspor returned second level after play-offs in the 2010–11 season but this return was brief due to money shortage. After two successive relegations between 2011 and 2013, they were placed in fourth level. all in all, Samsunspor was promoted to first level in 1969, 1976, 1982, 1985, 1991, 1993 and 2011 and relegated from first level in 1975, 1979, 1983, 1990, 1992, 2006 and 2012. Samsunspor currently plays in the First League, which is second tier in the Turkish league system.

Adanaspor is one of the most yo-yoed teams. They were promoted to first league in 1971, relegated in 1984, promoted again in 1988, relegated again in 1991, promoted in 1998, relegated in 2001 and promoted to first league last in 2002. They suffered from financial difficulties between 2003–2006 and were relegated to Third League, which is fourth level of Turkish league system in 2006 after three successive relegations. They also didn't win any match at third level in the 2005–06 season. But they recovered to Bank Asya First League in 2008 after two successive promotions.

Kasımpaşa S.K. is one of the recent yo-yo clubs, having been relegated from Süper Lig in 2008 and 2011, and promoted in 2007, 2009 and 2012. They also moved to and fro between Bank Asya First League, the second tier of Turkish football, and TFF Second League, the third level, before being promoted to Süper Lig. They also played in amateur level between 1979 and 1984 and fourth level between 2001 and 2005.

Other yo-yo clubs in Turkey are below:

Mersin İdman Yurdu:

1st Level: 1967–1974, 1976–1978, 1980–1981, 1982–1983, 2011–2013, 2014–

2nd Level: 1963–1967, 1974–1976, 1978–1980, 1981–1982, 1983–2001, 2002–2006, 2009–2011, 2013–2014

3rd Level: 2001–2002, 2006–2009

Adana Demirspor

1st Level: 1960–1961 (Played home matches in Ankara), 1973–1984, 1987–1990, 1991–1992, 1994–1995

2nd Level: 1963–1973, 1984–1987, 1990–1991, 1992–1994, 1995–1999, 2002–2004, 2012–

3rd Level: 1999–2002, 2004–2012

Amateur Level: 1958–1960, 1961–1963

Antalyaspor (since 2010 as Medical Park Antalyaspor due to sponsorship agreement)

1st Level: 1982–1985, 1986–1987, 1994–2002, 2006–2007, 2008–2014

2nd Level: 1966–1982, 1985–1986, 1987–1994, 2002–2006, 2007–2008, 2014–

Diyarbakırspor (It was dissolved due to enormous unpaid debts in 2013)

1st Level: 1977–1980, 1981–1982, 1986–1987, 2001–2006, 2009–2010

2nd Level: 1976–1977, 1980–1981, 1982–1986, 1987–2001, 2006–2009, 2010–2011

3rd Level: 1968–1976, 2011–2012

4th Level: 2012–2013

Şekerspor (Also played as Şekerhilal, Etimesgut Şekerspor, Akyurt Şekerspor, Beypazarı Şekerspor and Çamlıdere Şekerspor, now is Polatlı Şekerspor)

1st Level: 1959–1963, 1964–1966, 1967–1969, 1972–1973, 1997–1998

2nd Level: 1963–1964, 1966–1967, 1969–1972, 1973–1992, 1994–1997, 1998–2003

3rd Level: 1992–1994, 2003–2005, 2006–2013

4th Level: 2005–2006, 2013–

Göztepe

1st Level: 1958–1977, 1978–1980, 1981–1982, 1999–2000, 2001–2003

2nd Level: 1977–1978, 1980–1981, 1982–1999, 2000–2001, 2003–2004, 2011–2013

3rd Level: 2004–2005, 2009–2011, 2013–

4th Level: 2005–2007, 2008–2009 (Göztepe took place of Aliağaspor in 2008)

Amateur Level: 2007–2008

Kayseri Erciyesspor (Kayserispor before 2004–2005 season)

1st Level: 1973–1975, 1979–1980, 1985–1986, 1992–1996, 1997–1998, 2005–2007, 2013–

2nd Level: 1966–1973, 1975–1979, 1980–1985, 1986–1989, 1991–1992, 1996–1997, 1998–2007, 2007–2013

3rd Level: 1989–1991

Çaykur Rizespor (Rizespor before 1990–1991 season)

1st Level: 1979–1981, 1985–1989, 2000–2002, 2003–2008, 2013–

2nd Level: 1974–1979, 1981–1985, 1989–1993, 1994–2000, 2002–2003, 2008–2013

3rd Level: 1968–1974, 1993–1994

Giresunspor

1st Level: 1971–1977

2nd Level: 1967–1971, 1977–1978, 1979–1986, 1988–1991, 1993–1995, 1997–2000, 2007–2012, 2014–

3rd Level: 1977–1978, 1986–1988, 1991–1993, 1995–1997, 2000–2001, 2005–2007, 2012–2014

4th Level: 2001–2005

Manisaspor (Before 1965 Manisa Sakaryaspor, aka Vestel Manisaspor twice)

1st Level: 2005–2008, 2009–2012

2nd Level: 1964–1978, 1980–1983, 1985–1986, 1991–1993, 1994–1995, 2002–2005, 2008–2009, 2012–

3rd Level: 1978–1980, 1984–1985, 1986–1991, 1993–1994, 1995–2002

Amateur Level: 1958–1964, 1983–1984

Argentina

Quilmes Atlético Club is the club with most promotions and relegations in Argentina, with eight times each.

Brazil

Santa Cruz is traditionally a yo-yo club. Playing from 1971 to 1981 on the top flight, since 1982 the club has spent nine seasons in the Brasileirão Série A, 18 seasons in the second division, three in the third division and three in the Brasileirão Série D. The team currently competes in Série C. Since 2014, Avaí has been promoted to the top flight on even numbered years and relegated to the second division on odd numbered years. Since 2016, Sampaio Corrêa has been relegated to Série C on even numbered years and promoted back to Série B on odd numbered years. Other clubs who recently swung between divisions are América Mineiro, Criciúma, Sport Recife, Náutico, Coritiba, Figueirense, Ponte Preta, Bahia, Vitória, Guarani and Vasco. Most of them are from the Northeastern region of Brazil and from smaller cities of São Paulo state.

References

External links
 Yoyo teams worldwide (RSSSF)

Association football terminology